Guoyao Wu is a Chinese-American animal scientist. He is a Distinguished Professor of Animal Science at Texas A&M University and a fellow of the American Association for the Advancement of Science (AAAS).

Biography
Wu received an undergraduate degree in Animal Science from the South China Agricultural University, then a master's degree in Animal Nutrition from China Agricultural University (formerly Beijing Agricultural University). He earned master's and Ph.D. degrees in Animal Biochemistry from the University of Alberta, Canada. He completed postdoctoral research in Nutrition and Metabolism (Diabetes and Obesity) at McGill University Faculty of Medicine and in Biochemistry at Memorial University of Newfoundland Faculty of Medicine in Canada. Wu is a University Distinguished Professor of Animal Science at Texas A&M University. He is also affiliated with the university's Mentored Research Program in Space Life Sciences, where he examines nutrition issues related to space travel and skeletal muscle metabolism. 

Much of Wu's research has focused on amino acid biochemistry and nutrition in animals, including the arginine-nitric oxide pathway, as well as the syntheses of the arginine-family of amino acids (including arginine, citrulline, glutamate, glutamine, and proline) and glycine in mammals, birds and fish. He is credited for proposing two important concepts in nutrition: functional amino acids and dietary requirements of animals for de novo synthesizable amino acids. His work has transformed the feeding of animals worldwide and also has important implications for human nutrition and health.

In 2012, Wu was elected Fellow of the AAAS. He is listed among the Thomson Reuters Highly Cited Researchers for 2014-2021. His papers (including 726 articles in peer-reviewed journals) have been cited over 78,500 times with an H-index of 135 and an i10-index of 596 in Google Scholar. Three of his journal articles have each been cited over 3,100 times, and six of his other papers have each been cited over 1,100 times. He has published two textbooks/reference books: "Amino Acids: Biochemistry and Nutrition" (CRC Press, 2013 and 2022) and "Principles of Animal Nutrition" (CRC Press, 2018). Wu has also contributed articles on amino acid nutrition and metabolism to The Encyclopedia of Animal Science, The Encyclopedia of Animal Nutrition, and The Encyclopedia of Human Nutrition. 

Wu has received many awards from his professional societies, including the Established Investigator award from the American Heart Association (1998); the AFIA Nonruminant Nutrition Research Award from the American Society of Animal Science (ASAS, 2004); the FASS-AFIA New Frontiers in Animal Nutrition Award from the Federation of Animal Science Societies (2008); and the Morrison award from the ASAS (2018). He has served on the Editorial Advisory Boards of "The Biochemical Journal", "The Journal of Nutrition", and "Journal of Animal Science and Biotechnology".  Wu has also served as an Editor of "Amino Acids", SpringerPlus: Amino Acids Collection, "Frontiers in Bioscience", "Advances in Experimental Medicine and Biology" (volumes on amino acid nutrition and metabolism in animals), The Encyclopedia of Animal Nutrition, and the Journal of Nutritional Biochemistry.

References

Living people
Texas A&M University faculty
Fellows of the American Association for the Advancement of Science
Year of birth missing (living people)